Piyan may refer to:
 Pian-e Olya
 Pian-e Sofla
 Pian Rural District